The Air Reserve Personnel Center manages personnel records for the Air National Guard and Air Force Reserve and it is located at Buckley Space Force Base in Aurora, Colorado. It maintains the virtual Personnel Center, a Web-based portal for Airmen to perform personnel services transactions.

The major command direct reporting unit of Air Force Reserve Command with technical and policy guidance provided by the Chief of Air Force Reserve.

Operations
ARPC is responsible for personnel and administrative support to more than 970,000 Air Force Reserve Command and Air National Guard forces to ensure they are available resources in the event of a national emergency. The center provides support throughout their military careers, from initial entry to retirement, including assignments, promotions and separations

Units
 ARPC Personnel Data Update Branch (DPSD4): provides service to a large customer base including Individual Mobilization Augmentees (IMA), Individual Ready Reservists (IRR) and "Gray Area" retirees.
 ARPC Recognition Services Branch (DPSD3): provides service to a large customer service base to include Individual Mobilization Augmentees, Individual Ready Reserve.
 ARPC Selection Board Secretariat develops and implements personnel policies and procedures relating to officer and enlisted promotions and evaluations for the Reserve components; as well as, managing individual mobilization augmentte performance programs.
 Air Force Reserve Advisory Board: the primary, direct-feed forum to develop and implement clear policies for the Air Force Reserve
 Readiness Management Group: established April 1, 2005, at Air Reserve Personnel Center, Aurora, Colo., and transferred to Robins Air Force Base, Ga., on July 1, 2005, to align administrative control within the Air Force Reserve Command.

History
 Section source: ARPC Factsheet
The Center was established Nov. 1, 1953, as Detachment 1, Headquarters Continental Air Command, to centralize the custody and maintenance of master personnel records of Reserve Airmen not on extended active duty. The detachment officially began operations March 1, 1954, and soon had responsibilities for a wide variety of personnel actions, including administrative capability for mobilization of the Air Force Reserve.

On Jan. 1, 1957, the organization became Headquarters Air Reserve Records Center, acquiring the status of a numbered Air Force within Continental Air Command. Because of increasing involvement in all areas of personnel management, the Center was renamed the Air Reserve Personnel Center on Sept. 1, 1965. Responsibility for maintaining personnel records of Air National Guard officers was added in July 1971, and enlisted Airmen in March 1978.

ARPC was designated a separate operating agency on Aug. 1, 1968, with no significant change in mission. In 1978, its status changed to that of a direct reporting unit and organizational element of the Air Force Reserve. Separate operating agency status was re-established May 1, 1983. The Center was designated as a field operating agency Feb. 5, 1991. With the establishment of the Air Force Reserve Command (AFRC) on Feb. 17, 1997, ARPC was assigned to AFRC as a major command direct reporting unit.

The center moved from the former Lowry Air Force Base to its current location at Buckley Space Force Base Aug. 1, 2011.

Mission
"To deliver strategic Total Force human resource warfighting capability for the Air Force."

Vision
"To be the recognized leader providing human resource services to generations of Airmen."

Finance
Provides professional financial management services and budget support for Air Reserve Personnel Center headquarters and  Select Members of the Ready Reserve.

See also
 Defense Finance and Accounting Service, former Lowry AFB, Denver, CO
 Air Reserve Technician Program
 Civil Reserve Air Fleet

References

External links
 This article contains information that originally came from a US Government website, in the public domain.
 Air Force Reserve Official Website
 Air Force Reserve Command Website
 Air Force Link Fact Sheet

Centers of the United States Air Force
Military in Aurora, Colorado
United States Air Force Reserves
Military units and formations in Colorado
Military units and formations established in 1965